Bear Cove may refer to:
Bear Cove, Newfoundland and Labrador (disambiguation)
Bear Cove, Nova Scotia (disambiguation)
Bear Cove, British Columbia